Buceo is a barrio (neighbourhood or district) in Montevideo, Uruguay.

Location
Buceo borders Pocitos and Villa Dolores to the west, Parque Batlle, Unión and Malvín Norte to the north, Malvín to the east and the coastline to the south.

Features and maritime activities
 The coastal avenue along Buceo takes on the names Rambla Armenia and Rambla República de Chile. Across it is the Port of Buceo and opposite to it, a building with a pointed tower, which houses the Oceanographic Museum. After this, stretches the beach of Buceo.

Buceo is home to the biggest shopping mall of the city, the Montevideo Shopping, and to the World Trade Center Montevideo.

An architecturally important building is the Edificio Panamericano, opposite the Port of Buceo. The port is home to Montevideo's principal marina and has a beach by the same name.  It is prime for hosting sailing racing events and has in the past.

In October 2012 a giant statue of the project Greetingman was unveiled in Buceo, near the seashore.

Educational facilities
Lycée Français de Montevideo (private, bilingual)

Places of worship
 Parish Church of St. Peter Apostle, José Leguizamón 3684 (Roman Catholic)

Noted historical feature
At the Buceo Cemetery, the Uruguayan Civil War and National (blanco) party leader Aparicio Saraiva (d. 1904) was buried.

Across the street is The British Cemetery, which was founded in 1828.

External links

 Intendencia de Montevideo / Useful data / Buceo
 Intendencia de Montevideo / Historia del Buceo

 
Barrios of Montevideo
Beaches of Uruguay
Articles containing video clips